This is a list of active power stations in Western Australia. Candidates for this list must already be commissioned and capable of generating 1 MW or more of electricity.

There are several independent electricity grids in Western Australia; the "Grid" column in the following tables indicates which grid each power station is connected to.

Coal fired 

These fossil fuel power stations burn coal to power steam turbines that generate some or all of the electricity they produce.

Total max. capacity: 1677 MW

Gas turbine 

These gas turbine power stations use gas combustion to generate some or all of the electricity they produce.

Total max. capacity:  4314 MW

Gas (thermal) 

These power stations use gas combustion to power steam turbines that generate some or all of the electricity they produce.

Total max. capacity:  274  MW

Gas (reciprocating) 

These power stations use gas combustion in reciprocating engines to generate some or all of the electricity they produce.

Total max. capacity:  108 MW

Hydroelectric 

These hydroelectric power stations use the flow of water to generate some or all of the electricity they produce.

Total max. capacity: 32 MW

Wind farms 

These wind farm power stations use the power of the wind to generate some or all of the electricity they produce.

Total max. capacity: 1012 MW

Biomass combustion 

These power stations burn biomass (biofuel) to generate some or all of the electricity they produce.

Total max. capacity: 6 MW

Solar Photovoltaic 

These power stations use a semiconductor device that converts sunlight into electricity.

Total max. capacity: 191 MW

See also 

 List of power stations in Australia
 Synergy (electricity corporation)

References

External links 
Government of Western Australia Office of Energy
List of Green Power approved generators (pdf)
Australian Business Council for Sustainable Energy
BCSE Renewable Energy Power Plant Register 2006 (pdf)

Western Australia, active
 
Power stations